Holder v Holder [1968] Ch 353 is an English trusts law case concerning conflict of interest.

Facts
Victor Holder was an executor of his father’s will. He wanted to renounce executorship, after he had performed some tasks in that capacity. Unfortunately that technically meant the executorship could not be properly renounced. The remaining executors put two farms up for auction, on which Victor was a tenant. Victor bought them at the auction. The other beneficiaries of the trust claimed he could not make the purchase, because it would constitute a conflict of interest.

Judgment
Harman LJ and Danckwerts LJ delivered judgments distinguishing this from Lord Eldon’s strong words in Ex parte James and Ex parte Lacey because everybody concerned knew that the purchase was planned, and maybe Lord Eldon exaggerated in saying that you can never determine what somebody knows.

Sachs LJ concurred that there was no conflict of interest. He took the view that a hard and fast rule prohibiting all transactions was unnecessary and could be unjust. The courts should examine the facts and then determine whether setting the sale aside is appropriate.

See also
Keech v Sandford
Ex parte James (1803) 32 ER 385
Boardman v Phipps

Notes

References
M Conaglen (2006) argued that if a beneficiary has given fully informed consent and the price is fair then a sale to a trustee will be unimpeachable

English trusts case law
Court of Appeal (England and Wales) cases
1968 in case law
1968 in British law